Neesiella is a genus of liverworts belonging to the family Aytoniaceae.

Species:
 Neesiella echinoides (L.) Sreem.

References

Aytoniaceae
Liverwort genera